Castle Terrace may refer to:

United Kingdom
Castle Terrace, Chepstow
Castle Street, Oxford
Castle Terrace, Edinburgh, including the Category B listed 'Castle Terrace Car Park'.

United States
Castle Terrace Historic District, Clinton, Iowa

References